Machnow is a surname. Notable people with the surname include:

Emily Machnow (1897–1974), Swedish swimmer
Feodor Machnow (1876–1912)